The 1971 Ole Miss Rebels football team represented the University of Mississippi during the 1971 NCAA University Division football season. It was the first Rebel squad since 1946 to not be coached by Johnny Vaught, who was forced to take a leave of absence midway through the previous campaign due to health concerns. This was also Ole Miss' last all-white varsity team. The Rebels and Southeastern Conference rival LSU were the last major college teams still fielding all-white squads. LSU also fielded its first desegregated varsity squad in 1972.

Schedule

Roster

Game summaries

Mississippi St

Awards
All-SEC: DT Elmer Allen (AP, 1st Team), DB Paul Dongieux (AP, 2nd Team), TE Jim Poole Jr. (UPI, 1st Team)

References

Ole Miss
Ole Miss Rebels football seasons
Peach Bowl champion seasons
Ole Miss Rebels football